Sabaneyev (Сабане́ев) or Sabaneev is a Russian Surname. It may refer to:

 Boris Leonidovich Sabaneyev (1880–1917), Russian composer
 Leonid Sabaneyev (1881–1968), Russian musicologist, music critic, composer and scientist
 Leonid Pavlovich Sabaneyev (1844–1898), Russian zoologist

Russian-language surnames